Pat Hennen (born April 27, 1953 in Phoenix, Arizona) is an American former Grand Prix motorcycle road racer. He is notable for being the first American to win a 500 cc World Championship race, the 1976 500cc Finnish Grand Prix. Competing as a non-factory rider, he finished third overall in the GP World Championship standings that season, only 2 points behind runner-up Tepi Länsivuori and fellow Suzuki factory rider Barry Sheene.

When competing in the 1978 Isle of Man TT races, he suffered career-ending injuries after recording the first ever sub-20 minute lap on a 500 cc Suzuki in the Senior TT.

Early racing career

Hennen began his career racing in dirt track AMA District 36 dirt track racing events in Northern California. In 1973, he was teamed with John Gennai and later Rick Hocking riding Steve Doi-sponsored bikes, both of whom went on to AMA Pro National Championship Series dirt track racing. Hennen's dirt track success earned him the support of Suzuki factory road racer Ron Grant, who mentored Hennen and played a key role in helping him build a successful pro road race career. Hennen switched from professional dirt track to road racing full-time in 1973, but occasionally competed in selected AMA dirt track races, believing that his dirt track experience gave him a distinct advantage in road racing.

Early pro career

In 1974, Hennen won all but one race of the AMA's Junior Road Race National Championship Series, earning him a spot on U.S. Suzuki's factory road race team for the 1975 season, alongside teammate and multi-time AMA National Champion Gary Nixon. At the end of the ’75 season, the U.S. national gas crisis severely impacted all forms of motorsports in the U.S., prompting U.S. Suzuki to shut down its factory road race team for the following season.

Riding as a privateer in 1976, Hennen rode an ex-factory Suzuki TR750 to third overall in the Daytona 200, the first time a Suzuki had finished in the top 3 at Daytona. Riding a production Yamaha TZ250 in the 250cc race at Daytona, he finished a very close runner-up to Yamaha factory rider Roberts after a race-long duel.

Grand Prix career

Hennen moved to the European Grand Prix circuit after Daytona in 1976, competing as a privateer in the 500cc World Championships series on a production Suzuki RG 500. He also competed in the fledgling Formula 750 series on the same ex-factory TR750 he rode at Daytona that year. The 500cc World Championships were the highest level of professional road racing during that era. After a slow start to the season learning to compete on the GP circuits, Hennen finished runner-up in the Dutch GP at Assen, behind Sheene and ahead of multi-time World Champion Giacomo Agostini. From that race on, Hennen consistently finished in the top three and won his first GP, the Finnish GP, behind the legendary Finnish rider Länsivuori, who later became Hennen's mentor. Länsivuori was responsible for Hennen's adopting the style of riding made popular by Länsivuori and fellow legendary Finnish rider Jarno Saarinen, where they stayed very low while hanging off the side of the bike dramatically when cornering, their knee lightly dragging over the tarmac.

Having established himself as one of the top three GP riders in ’76 earned Hennen a position on Suzuki Japan's factory GP road race team for 1977, teamed with newly crowned 500cc World Champion Sheene and fellow Brit Steve Parrish, now a TV motorsports commentor. Hennen's many often contentious battles on and off the track with Sheene were widely publicized in the world press. A sports fan poll conducted by a major UK newspaper in 1977 found that Hennen was the second most recognized American athlete worldwide, behind tennis player John McEnroe. Sheene was unhappy about being teamed on a British-based team with a young American who was a clear threat.

Hennen's bid for the 1977 World Championship was spoiled by a 170 mph crash at the Italian Grand Prix, at Imola, two laps after he took the lead in the race. The leg injury he sustained also cost him points at the next two GPs, but he regained his form by season's end, winning the 1977 British Grand Prix at the Silverstone Circuit, the first ever Grand Prix held on the British mainland. Beatle George Harrison and his wife hosted the victory dinner for Hennen and the rest of the Suzuki factory team after his Silverstone win. Harrison and Ringo Starr were close friends of Sheene and regularly attended Grand Prix events as VIP guests of the Suzuki GP team. Hennen followed that win with a victory at the prestigious Mallory Park Race of the Year.

Sheene won the opening round at Caracas, Venezuela, and Hennen the next round at Jarama, Spain, in convincing style, followed by Roberts, who then took the next round, at Nogaro, France. The title had become a two-man battle between Hennen and Roberts, with Sheene consistently finishing behind the two.

At midseason, Roberts led Hennen by 3 points, with Sheene some distance back. With the most challenging GP circuits ahead of them, Hennen had become the odds-on favorite of many GP racing cognoscente to win the World Championship. But Hennen's title chase came to an end when he suffered a career-ending crash at the 1978 Isle of Man TT, regarded as the world's most dangerous circuit. He had just recorded the first ever sub-twenty-minute lap in TT history when he clipped a curb at 160 m.p.h. There was a suggestion at the time that he had struck a bird although this is now considered an unfounded rumor. The horrific crash caused injuries that ultimately led to his retirement from racing.[3] Roberts was later quoted as saying, “I had everyone covered in ’78 but Pat Hennen.”

Car racing career

In 1976, after recording his first win on the European continent at a national race at the Österreichring circuit, Austria, Hennen was introduced to the head of the BMW car factory's fledgling driver development program. After turning in an impressive test drive at the Österreichring in a Formula Ford, Hennen was signed to a three-year development driver contract. Whenever his Grand Prix motorcycle schedule would permit it, Hennen started competing in car races to learn how to race first closed wheel and then open wheel race cars. He finished second overall in the Saturday round of the 1977 Formula Ford Festival, at Brands Hatch, England, competing against Chico Serra and Nigel Mansel, who later became front-running F1 drivers.

Other racing successes
 Won the 1977 Race of the Year, at Mallory Park, the biggest "national" race in the UK during the 1970s. 
 Top points scorer at the 1978 Transatlantic Trophy match races, ahead of Kenny Roberts, scoring three wins, two seconds and a third.
 Won the New Zealand Marlboro series three consecutive years (1974–75, 1975–76 and 1976–77), riding Suzuki TR500, TR750 and RG500 machines. The South Pacific's most prestigious road race series during the ‘70s, the Marlboro Series was run over five seasons.

Honors and awards
 Hennen was inducted into the AMA Motorcycle Hall of Fame in 2007.
 In the GP/MotoGP racing’s record books, Hennen is still ranked in the top 10 in podium finishes, along with other legendary GP riders like Mike Hailwood, Giacomo Agostini, Sheene and Roberts.

Personal life today

Hennen resides in Northern California, in the San Francisco Bay Area, and regularly attends GP Legends and Vintage Race Motorcycle events around the world. He has returned to the Isle of Man twice since his career-ending crash there.

Grand Prix career statistics 

(key) (Races in bold indicate pole position; races in italics indicate fastest lap)

External links
 Pat Hennen at the AMA Hall of Fame
 Pat Hennen in January 1977 American Motorcyclist Magazine article on European road racing
 Reminiscences of Hennen's visits to Australia
 An Interview With Pat Hennen

References

1953 births
Living people
American motorcycle racers
500cc World Championship riders
Isle of Man TT riders
Sportspeople from Phoenix, Arizona